Blueboy, Blue Boy, or Blues Boy or Blue Boys may refer to:

 The Blue Boy, a c. 1770 painting by Thomas Gainsborough
 "The Blue Boy", 1876 watercolor by Winslow Homer
 Blue Boy (novel), a 1932 novel by Jean Giono
 The Blue Boy (picture book), a 1992 children's book by Martin Auer
 Blueboy (plant), or Stirlingia, a plant genus
 Blue Boy, a rosemary cultivar
 Blueboy (magazine), a gay pornographic magazine
 Blue Boys F.C., Namibian football club
 The Blue Boy (film)

Music
 The Blue Boys, 1920s American ragtime band of Prater & Hayes
 The Blueboys, mid-1960s, predecessor of The Blue Things
 Blue Boys, a backing group for Jim Reeves
 Blue Boy (song), a 1958 single by Jim Reeves
 Blue Boys (Danish band), 1960s
 Blueboy (band), a 1990s English indie pop band
 Blue Boy (DJ), Scottish DJ Lex Blackmore
 Superblue or Blueboy (born 1956), Trinidadian musician Austin Lyons
 Blue Boys, a record label for Crash Test 02, Club Test 02, Bloom 06 and other albums
 Blue Boy (album), a 2001 album by Ron Sexsmith
 "Blue Boy", a 1970 song by Joni Mitchell from the album Ladies of the Canyon
 "Blue Boy", a 1980 single by Orange Juice
 "Blueboy", a 1997 song by John Fogerty from the album Blue Moon Swamp

See also
Boy Blue (disambiguation)
 The Boy in Blue (disambiguation)
 Bluebuck, an antelope
 Blue boy trial